ŽFK Mašinac PZP (Serbian Cyrillic: ЖФК Maшинaц ПЗП) is a women's football club based in Niš, Serbia. The club was the most successful women's football club of SFR Yugoslavia, FR Yugoslavia and Serbia. They play at Mašinac Stadium, in Delijski Vis neighborhood in Niš.

History
Masinac was founded 1970. In 1987 the Club moved to new stadium in Delijski Vis neighborhood in Nis. In 1990 they made agreement for sponsorship with Niš Tobacco Factory.

Titles
It is the most successful women's football club of FR Yugoslavia and Serbia and in the south-east of Europe, winning 19 titles of Yugoslav champion and 10 trophies of Yugoslav Cup winners. They succeeded to organize a school of football (over 150 players) with its own stadium and side fields.

The coach
The coach of the club Perica Krstić,has been the first coach of Yugoslav women's national team since 1974, and has been the first coach of Yugoslav women's national team over 20 years.

Current squad

Notable former players
  Jovana Sretenović
  Christina Sampanidis
  Aricca Vitanza
  Catiana Vitanza

Titles

Official
 National championships (24)
 Champion of Yugoslavia: 1983/84, 1984/85, 1985/86, 1986/87, 1987/88, 1988/89, 1989/90, 1991/92, 1992/93, 1994/95, 1995/96, 1996/97, 1997/98, 1998/99, 1999/00, 2000/01, 2001/02
 Champion of Serbia and Montenegro: 2002/03, 2003/04, 2004/05, 2005/06
 Champion of Serbia: 2007/08, 2008/09, 2009/10
 National cup (15)
 Cup of Yugoslavia: 1982/83, 1983/84, 1987/88, 1988/89, 1990/91, 1991/92, 1994/95, 1995/96, 1996/97, 1998/99
 Cup of Serbia and Montenegro: 2002/03
 Serbian Women's Cup: 2007/08, 2008/09, 2009/10, 2010/11

Invitational
 Menton Tournament (1): 1989

References

External links
Official website 

Women's football clubs in Serbia
Sport in Niš
1970 establishments in Serbia
Association football clubs established in 1970